Master of the Moon is the tenth and final studio album by American heavy metal band Dio. It was released on August 30, 2004 in Europe through SPV/Steamhammer and on September 7, 2004 in the US through Sanctuary Records. It was produced by Ronnie James Dio.

Background 
The album marks the return of guitarist Craig Goldy, who also performed on Dio's Dream Evil (1987) and Magica (2000). It also features Jeff Pilson on bass, Simon Wright on drums and Scott Warren on keyboards.

One song, "Death by Love", was partly written by former Magica touring bassist Chuck Garric. There are no writing credits provided in the album's liner notes.

On the supporting tour for the album, Dio went on the road with Fireball Ministry and Anthrax opening. As usual, he reached into his catalogue and played songs from various stages of his career, including Rainbow and Black Sabbath songs.

Due to other commitments, Pilson was unable to tour the album and Rudy Sarzo took over the bass guitar duties.

Reissue
In 2019, Master of the Moon was remastered and announced for reissue in 2020. The first disc is identical to the original North American release. The reissue includes a second disc containing four live tracks recorded during the Master of the Moon tour as well as "The Prisoner of Paradise" track originally included on the Japanese pressing of the album.

Track listing
The bonus track "The Prisoner of Paradise" is on the Japanese pressing of the album. The song would later be featured on the compilation The Very Beast of Dio Vol. 2 and included with the 2020 reissue of the album.

Personnel
Dio
 Ronnie James Dio – vocals
 Craig Goldy – guitar, keyboards
 Jeff Pilson – bass
 Simon Wright – drums
 Scott Warren – keyboards

Production
 Recorded at Total Access Recording in Redondo Beach, California
 Produced by Ronnie James Dio
 Engineered by Wyn Davis
 Brian Daughterty, Michael McMullen – assistant engineers
 Eddy Schreyer – mastering
 Cover illustration by Marc Sasso

Charts

References

External links 
Master of the Moon song lyrics

2004 albums
Dio (band) albums
Sanctuary Records albums
SPV/Steamhammer albums
Victor Entertainment albums